The Intermezzo in D minor (WAB 113) is an 1879 composition by the Austrian composer Anton Bruckner. Although it was intended to replace the scherzo of the String Quintet, that piece was instead performed in its original form; the Intermezzo was not publicly premiered until after the composer's death.

History

Bruckner completed his String Quintet in 1879 for a group headed by Joseph Hellmesberger Sr. However, Hellmesberger found the work's "curious, elfin scherzo" to be too challenging for the group to perform. In response, Bruckner wrote an eight-minute Intermezzo, which was completed in Vienna on 21 December 1879. The Intermezzo (WAB 113) was in the same key (D minor) as the original scherzo and used the same trio section, but its tempo was slower and it was less technically challenging.

The Intermezzo was originally intended as a less difficult alternative to the scherzo of the Quintet. Nevertheless, in 1885, Hellmesberger decided to proceed with the original Quintet after it had been premiered in full by the Winkler Quartet.

The manuscript of the Intermezzo was retrieved in 1900—after Bruckner's death—from the collection of his pupil Josef Schalk. There is no record of an earlier public performance.

The manuscript of the Intermezzo is stored in the archive of the Österreichische Nationalbibliothek. The Intermezzo was first published by Universal Edition in Vienna in 1913 (without its trio). It appeared in a complete critical edition in 1963, as appendix to the String Quintet, in Band XIII of the  edited by Leopold Nowak.

Music
Intermezzo, Moderato in 3/4:
 Theme: bars 1–42
 Development: bars 43–90
 Reprise: bars 91–142
Trio, Langsamer in E-flat major:
 Theme: bars 1–8, with repeat
 Development: bars 9–32
 Reprise: bars 33–40
Intermezzo da capo al fine

Although, as reviewer Wayne Reisig remarks, Bruckner "never wrote anything which could be termed 'pops' beyond the Austrian-German border", the Intermezzo might be considered in that genre: it is a "sunny little work saturated with the feel of the Tyrol". The piece was inspired by folk dances, particularly the ländler. Critic James Reel for the Arizona Daily Star described it as a "sometimes swaggering, sometimes hesitating minuet" that is reminiscent of Bruckner's orchestral writing.

Selected discography 
The Intermezzo is sometimes put as additional piece to recordings of the String Quintet.  At the end of manuscript of the Intermezzo Bruckner wrote "Trio", by which he meant the Trio from the original Scherzo. Since the first edition of the Intermezzo was issued without the Trio, people thought that the Intermezzo had no Trio, and so some recordings are without Trio and reprise.

The first recording occurred in 1956:
 Vienna Konzerthaus Quartet, Ferdinand Stangler (second viola). Bruckner: Quintet for Strings in F Major; Intermezzo for String Quintet. LP: Amadeo AVRS 6030. Without Trio.

A selection among the about 15 other recordings:

Without Trio 
 L'Archibudelli, Anton Bruckner: String Quintet. Intermezzo. Rondo. String Quartet. CD: Sony Classical Vivarte SK 66 251, 1994 –  on historical instruments.
 Fine Arts Quartet, Gil Sharon (second viola). Bruckner: String Quintet in F Major / String Quartet in C Minor. CD: Naxos 8.570788, 2007.

Full performance 
 Vienna Philharmonia Quintet. Bruckner – String Quintet in F major, Intermezzo in D minor for string quintet. LP: Decca STS 15400, 1974.
 Sonare Quartet, Vladimir Mendelssohn (second viola). String Quintet in F major / Intermezzo in D minor. CD: Claves CD 50-9006, 1990
 Melos Quartet, Enrique Santiago (second viola). Bruckner – Streichquintett F-Dur. CD: Harmonia Mundi HMC 901421, 1992
 Raphael Quartet, Prunella Pacey (second viola). Bruckner: String Quintet; Rondo; Intermezzo. CD: Globe 5078, 1992
 Vienna String Quintet, Bruckner: String Quintet in F, Intermezzo in D. CD: Camerata 30CM-399, 1994
 Leipzig String Quartet, Hartmut Rohde (second viola). Bruckner: String Quintet F major / String Quartet C minor. CD: MDG 307 1362-2, 2005.
 Fitzwilliam Quartet, James Boyd (second viola). Anton Bruckner: String Quintet / String Quartet. CD: Linn LC 11615, 2011 – on historical instruments
 Bartholdy Quintet, Bruckner – Zemlinsky String Quintets – CD: CAvi Music 8553348, 2013

References

Sources 
 Anton Bruckner: Sämtliche Werke: Band XIII/2: Streichquintett F-Dur / Intermezzo d-Moll, Musikwissenschaftlicher Verlag der Internationalen Bruckner-Gesellschaft, Leopold Nowak (Ed.), Vienna, 1963; revised edition by Gerold G. Gruber, 2007 
 Cornelis van Zwol, Anton Bruckner 1824–1896 – Leven en werken, uitg. Thoth, Bussum, Netherlands, 2012. 
 Uwe Harten, Anton Bruckner. Ein Handbuch. , Salzburg, 1996.

External links
 
 Intermezzo d-Moll, WAB 113 Critical discography by Hans Roelofs 
 Live performance by iPalpiti Soloists (2012): Bruckner - Posthumous Intermezzo - without Trio

Chamber music by Anton Bruckner
Compositions in D minor
Bruckner
1879 compositions